Campo Verde Solar Project is a 139-megawatt (MWAC) solar photovoltaic power station in Imperial County, California. The project was approved in December 2012. Construction began in early 2013 and was completed the same year. Designed and constructed by U.S. thin-film manufacturer First Solar, the plant uses nearly 2.3 million CdTe-PV modules. Campo Verde Solar was acquired in April 2013 by Southern Power and Turner Renewable Energy. First Solar acquired the project in 2012 from US Solar Holdings LLC, which had developed the project and negotiated the 139 MW PPA with SDG&E.

Production

See also

 Solar power in California
 List of photovoltaic power stations

References

Solar power stations in California
Photovoltaic power stations in the United States
Energy infrastructure completed in 2013